is a former Japanese football player.

Club statistics

References

External links
J.League

1984 births
Living people
Association football people from Osaka Prefecture
Japanese footballers
J2 League players
Japan Football League players
Albirex Niigata players
Association football forwards